"Hammerhead" is the second single from Australian rock musician James Reyne’s debut self-titled solo studio album, released in 1987.
The track featured uncredited backing vocals by Olivia Newton-John.

Reyne reflected on the song saying: ""Hammerhead" was not necessarily about me, but let's say I thought I knew what I was talking about. I wrote it with Simon Hussey; the music Simon and I wrote together and I wrote the lyrics. From memory it seemed to come quite easily. I shouldn't make too much about the fact that it's about drugs. It can be taken many ways. It was an exercise in trying to write a song about that subject but to also make it that it could be about a relationship. It's a song about a relationship. And whether that relationship is with a substance or a person, it's an obsessive relationship".

Track listings
 CD / Cassette Single
 "Hammerhead" - 4:46
 "Coin in a Plate" - 4:14

 7" Promo Single
 "Hammerhead"  (7" Edit)  - 4:19
 "Burning Wood" - 2:43

Charts

Weekly charts

Year-end charts

External links

References

1987 songs
Capitol Records singles
James Reyne songs
Songs written by Simon Hussey
Songs written by James Reyne